Daniel Woolhouse, also known as 'Fanga Dan', is a three-time D1NZ Champion and professional Drifting driver from Whangarei, New Zealand.

Competing with the iconic Driftcorp team he began drifting competitively in 2003, entering his first full season in 2005 driving a Nissan Laurel C33 in the D1NZ National Drifting Championship and finishing 3rd overall in his rookie year. Moving to a purpose built Nissan S15 Silvia he would go on to win the 2006 D1NZ Championship in just his second year of competition,
also becoming the third Driftcorp driver to win a national title.

In 2008 Woolhouse built and drove one of the first Holden VZ Commodores in competitive drifting, powered by a 2.6 liter Nissan RB engine.

In 2010 'Fanga Dan' represented New Zealand and competed in Thailand, Singapore and Malaysia driving for Goodyear Racing in the Holden VZ Commodore, claiming wins and podium finishes in Formula Drift Asia and the Goodyear International Drift Series. 'Fanga Dan' competed overseas again in 2011 and 2012, driving for Castrol Edge in the Tectaloy International Drift Challenge as part of the annual World Time Attack event in Sydney, Australia.

After retiring his championship winning Nissan S15 in 2010, now driven by Driftcorp team-mate Robee Nelson, Woolhouse went on to compete an LS2 V8 powered Holden VZ Commodore in the 2013 D1NZ Championship Series for his naming rights sponsor Castrol Edge, in which he became the 2013 New Zealand Drift Champion.

References 

New Zealand racing drivers
Living people
Drifting drivers
Sportspeople from Whangārei
1983 births